Can't Stand Anymore is a 2013–14 South Korean television series starring Baek Il-seob, Sunwoo Yong-nyeo, Lee Young-eun and Kim Jin-woo. It aired on JTBC's Monday–Friday time slot from August 5, 2013 to January 9, 2014.

Synopsis
The story of Gil Bok-ja (Sunwoo Yong-nyeo) who decides to get a divorce after 50 years of marriage.

Cast

Main
 Baek Il-seob as Hwang Jong-gap
 Sunwoo Yong-nyeo as Gil Bok-ja
 Lee Young-eun as Hwang Sun-joo
 Kim Jin-woo as Jo Sung-woo

Supporting
 Oh Young-shil as Hwang Sun-ae
 Kim Hyung-il as Park Chang-soo
 Min Ji-young as Jin Ae-hee
 Lee Yul-eum as Park Eun-mi
 Park Chang-ik as Park Eun-soo
 Choi Ji-won as Yoon So-hyun
 Sunwoo Jae-duk as Hwang Sun-ho
 Bang Eun-hee as Yoo Jung-sook
 Kim Young-jae as Hwang Jae-min
 Kim Sung-min as Hwang Kang-ho
 Ahn Yeon-hong as Noh Young-hee
 Jo Min-ah as Hwang Jin-joo
 Hong Yeo-jin as Lee Nak-bok
 Chae So-young as Joo Se-yong
 Park Young-ji as Oh Man-bong
 Greena Park as Oh Seung-ri
 Kim Hyun-joon as Hong Bok-gyu
 Han Seung-hyun as Yoon Ji-hyun
 Lee Dae-ro as Grandfather

Production
Screenwriter Seo Young-myung, who signed an exclusive contract with JS Pictures in 2010, was notified of the annulation of her contract on September 6, 2013. At the time, 25 episodes had aired and seven more had been written. She filed a lawsuit for damages against the producers and broadcasters. She was replaced by Park Byung-wook.

References

External links
  
 

JTBC television dramas
Korean-language television shows
2013 South Korean television series debuts
2014 South Korean television series endings
South Korean romance television series
Television series by Drama House
Television series by JS Pictures